KRBW may refer to:

 KRBW (FM), a radio station (90.5 FM) licensed to Ottawa, Kansas, United States
 Lowcountry Regional Airport in Walterboro, South Carolina, United States